KPWK may refer to:
KPWK (AM), a radio station (1350 AM) licensed to serve San Bernardino, California, United States
KUBE (FM), a radio station (93.3 FM) licensed to serve Seattle, Washington, United States, which held the call letters KPWK from 2016 to 2018
Chicago Executive Airport, formerly known as Palwaukee, the GA airport serving Chicago, Illinois assigned the ICAO code KPWK